The 1999–2000 Wichita Thunder season was the eighth season of the CHL franchise in Wichita, Kansas.

Regular season

Division standings

See also
1999–00 CHL season

Wichita Thunder seasons
Wich